Brian Baker and Nikola Mektić were the defending champions, but Baker chose not to participate this year. Mektić played alongside Alexander Peya, but lost in the first round to Wesley Koolhof and Artem Sitak.

Dominic Inglot and Franko Škugor won the title, defeating Matwé Middelkoop and Andrés Molteni in the final, 6–7(8–10), 6–1, [10–8].

Seeds

Draw

Draw

References

External Links
 Main Draw

Hungarian Open (tennis)
Gazprom Hungarian Open – Doubles